Abbott Peak, also known as Abbotts, Dimitri or Demetri's Peak, is a pyramidal peak on Ross Island, on the north side of Mount Erebus, between it and Mount Bird. Charted by the British Antarctic Expedition under Robert Falcon Scott, 1910–13, and named after Petty Officer George P. Abbott, a member of the expedition.

Mountains of Ross Island